Federico Brusacà (born 30 January 1996) is an Italian footballer plays as a defender for SCD Ligorna. Besides Italy, he has played in Australia.

Career statistics

Club

Notes

References

External links
 Federico Brusacà at SportsTG

1996 births
Living people
Italian footballers
Italian expatriate footballers
Association football defenders
Genoa C.F.C. players
F.C. Lumezzane V.G.Z. A.S.D. players
S.S.D. Lucchese 1905 players
U.S.D. Lavagnese 1919 players
Serie D players
Serie C players
Italian expatriate sportspeople in Australia
Expatriate soccer players in Australia